Josef Jacobs was a German fighter ace of the First World War, credited with 48 confirmed and 12 unconfirmed aerial victories.

List of victories

This list is complete for entries, though obviously not for all details. Background data was abstracted from Above the Lines: The Aces and Fighter Units of the German Air Service, Naval Air Service and Flanders Marine Corps, 1914–1918, p. 136, and from The Aerodrome webpage on Jacobs  Additional sources are as noted. Abbreviations from those sources were expanded by editor creating this list.

References

Citations

Bibliography

 
 

Aerial victories of Jacobs, Josef
Jacobs, Josef